Small and Medium Enterprises in Afghanistan employ 10 to 500 employees, have sales up to US$1 million and paid-in capital of up to US$1 million. Lenders are banks, financing companies, some MFIs, local money exchange service providers (Hawala dealers), credit unions and societies. Most of these loans are disbursed against collateral of title deeds, land deeds, property and automobile deeds. Some small loans are secured by neighbors, personal guarantees and character.

The SME loans that are disbursed by these lenders range from US$2,000-250,000.

The majority of SMEs operate in cities such as Kabul, Mazar-e-Sharif, Herat, Kandahar, Ghazni, Jalalabad, Kunduz, Faizabad, Maimana, JawzJan and Taloqan.

Interest rates are marked from 12% up to 24% depending on mutual deals, loan amounts and credit history. Most formal lenders charge 0.5% to 2.0% of the loan amount as an up-front processing fee.

Economy of Afghanistan
Small and medium-sized enterprises